Badam Shirin may refer to:
Badam Shirin, Delfan, Lorestan Province
Badam Shirin, Selseleh, Lorestan Province